Fox Animation was a television channel in Italy owned by Fox Networks Group Italy, dedicated to animated series by Fox. The channel was launched on 15 December 2012.

Because of Sky Italia's deal with The Walt Disney Company Italy not being renewed, the channel was shut down on 1 October 2019, along with Disney XD, Disney in English, Fox Comedy and Nat Geo People.

Programming
The Simpsons
Futurama
Family Guy
American Dad
The Cleveland Show
Brickleberry
Bob's Burgers
King of the Hill
Bordertown
Son of Zorn
Archer
The Real Ghostbusters

References

Disney television networks
Fox Networks Group
Italian-language television stations
Defunct television channels in Italy
Television channels and stations established in 2012
Television channels and stations disestablished in 2019
2012 establishments in Italy
2019 disestablishments in Italy